Cape Bowling Green Light is an active lighthouse located on Cape Bowling Green, a lengthy headland ending with a long low sandspit, about  from Ayr, Queensland, Australia. The lighthouse is at the end of the headland, near the base of the sandspit. The first lighthouse at the location, established in 1874, was moved multiple times. It was prefabricated in Brisbane, shipped to the location, moved twice due to coastal erosion and finally transferred for display at the Australian National Maritime Museum at Darling Harbour in Sydney.

History
Many ships wrecking at Cape Bowling Green necessitated the construction of a lighthouse at the cape. The first Cape Bowling Green Light was constructed in 1874, one of 22 lighthouses of a similar design constructed in Queensland around that time. It was a round conical tower, constructed of local hardwood frame clad with galvanized iron plates imported from Britain. The lighthouse was prefabricated in Brisbane, then dismantled and shipped to the location to be erected again. The construction was done by the brothers John and Jacob Rooney of Maryborough, which also constructed Sandy Cape Light, Cowan Cowan Point Light, Cape Capricorn Light, Lady Elliot Island Light and Booby Island Light.

The apparatus was rotated with a clockwork mechanism and the station was operated by four lighthouse keepers, a chief and three assistants.

In 1878 beach erosion threatened the lighthouse for the first time and it was moved for the first time. In 1908 the tower had to be relocated further away for the same reason.

In 1913 an incandescent gas mantle operated by vaporised kerosene was installed, raising the power to 64,000 cd. In 1920 a fixed automatic acetylene gas lamp (carbide lamp) with a sun valve was installed. As a result, the lighthouse was demanned and all other buildings were demolished.

In 1985 a racon was installed.  In 1987 the lighthouse was replaced by the current skeletal tower. With the sponsorship of the Australian Maritime Safety Authority, the lighthouse was dismantled, and sections were lifted by a Department of Transport helicopter to a site where they were numbered, crated, and shipped to Sydney. By 1994 the lighthouse was reassembled at the Australian National Maritime Museum where it is now on display.  The lighthouse is still operational, using the original 3rd order lens and a typical 1913 clockwork mechanism, and it maintains its original light characteristic, four white flashes every twenty seconds (Fl.(4)W. 20s).

Current structure and display
The current tower is a square steel skeletal tower. It is topped by a square lantern structure with a gallery. It is painted white with a red horizontal band at the top.

Site operation and visiting
The current lighthouse is operated by the AMSA. The visiting status is unclear. The original lighthouse is owned and operated by the Australian National Maritime Museum, and it is open for guided tours daily.

See also

 List of lighthouses in Australia

Notes

References

External links

 Lighthouse at the Australian National Maritime Museum website

Lighthouses completed in 1874
Lighthouses completed in 1987
Lighthouses in Queensland
Australian National Maritime Museum
Buildings and structures in North Queensland
1874 establishments in Australia